(23 April 1894 – 10 August 1970), also known as Tetsuo Komai, was a Japanese-American actor, known for his minor roles in Hollywood films.

Biography
Born in Kumamoto, Kyushu, Komai had small parts in over 50 films from the 1920s until the mid 1960s. In his early films, Tetsu, who was usually called on to play Chinese characters, was often described with derogatory terms such as "Chinaman,". He played the villain in many of his films.

Komai emigrated to the United States in December 1907, arriving at the Port of Seattle; he lived in Seattle for several years after this initial immigration. During the Second World War, following the signing of Executive Order 9066, the actor, his wife, and their children were interned with groups of other Japanese-Americans and Japanese resident aliens at the Gila River War Relocation Center in Arizona from August 27, 1942 to November 3, 1945.

He died at the age of 76 in Gardena, California, of congestive heart failure.

Partial filmography

 The Unchastened Woman (1925)
 Old Ironsides (1926) - Pirate (uncredited)
 Tell It to the Marines (1926) - Hangchow Leader (uncredited)
 Shanghai Bound (1927) - Scarface
 Streets of Shanghai (1927) - Chang Ho
 Detectives (1928) - Chin Lee
 Moran of the Marines (1928) - Sun Yat
 The Woman from Moscow (1928) - Groom
 Manchu Love (1929)
 Chinatown Nights (1929) - Woo Chung (uncredited)
 Bulldog Drummond (1929) - Chong
 Welcome Danger (1929) - Florist Henchman (uncredited)
 New York Nights (1929) - Waiter (uncredited)
 King of Jazz (1930) - Emcee - Japanese Version
 The Return of Dr. Fu Manchu (1930) - Chang (uncredited)
 The Sea Wolf (1930) - Igo - Waiter in Honky Tonk (uncredited)
 East Is West (1930) - Hop Toy
 Oriente es Occidente (1930) - Hop Toy
 The Criminal Code (1930) - Convict (uncredited)
 La mujer X (1931) - Bit Role (uncredited)
 East of Borneo (1931) - Hrang the Raftsman (uncredited)
 Daughter of the Dragon (1931) - Lao (uncredited)
 Prestige (1931) - Sergeant
 She Wanted a Millionaire (1932) - Charlie
 Border Devils (1932) - The General
 Radio Patrol (1932) - Valet (uncredited)
 The Texas Bad Man (1932) - Yat Gow
 Roar of the Dragon (1932) - Messenger on Horseback (uncredited)
 War Correspondent (1932) - Fang
 The Mask of Fu Manchu (1932) - Swordsman (uncredited)
 The Secrets of Wu Sin (1932) - Wu Sin
 The Bitter Tea of General Yen (1932) - Gen. Yen's Messenger (uncredited)
 Island of Lost Souls (1932) - M'ling
 A Study in Scarlet (1933) - Ah Yet (uncredited)
 White Woman (1933) - Chisholm Servant (uncredited)
 Four Frightened People (1934) - Native Chief
 Now and Forever (1934) - Mr. Ling - Hotel Manager
 The Oil Raider (1934) - Chinese Cook (uncredited)
 Oil for the Lamps of China (1935) - Ho
 China Seas (1935) - Malay Pirate (uncredited)
 Without Regret (1935) - Gen. Wu Chen (uncredited)
 Hong Kong Nights (1935) - Wong
 Escape from Devil's Island (1935) - Ah Wong (uncredited)
 Klondike Annie (1936) - Lan Fang (uncredited)
 Roaming Lady (1936) - General Fang
 The Princess Comes Across (1936) - Detective Kawati
 Isle of Fury (1936) - Kim Lee
 History Is Made at Night (1937) - SOS Radio Operator (uncredited)
 China Passage (1937) - Wong (uncredited)
 That Man's Here Again (1937) - Wong (uncredited)
 The Singing Marine (1937) - Chang
 Outlaws of the Orient (1937) - Ho-Feng's Man (uncredited)
 West of Shanghai (1937) - General Ma (uncredited)
 Torchy Blane in Chinatown (1939) - Lem Kee (uncredited)
 The Real Glory (1939) - Alipang
 The Letter (1940) - Head Boy
 Adventures of Captain Marvel (1941, Serial) - Chan Lai [Ch. 4]
 They Met in Bombay (1941) - Capt. Chang's First Mate (uncredited)
 Sundown (1941) - Kuypens' Shenzi Aide (uncredited)
 Green Dolphin Street (1947) - Chinese Man (uncredited)
 Task Force (1949) - Japanese Representative (uncredited)
 Tokyo Joe (1949) - Lt. Gen. 'The Butcher' Takenobu (uncredited)
 Japanese War Bride (1952) - Japanese Servant
 Tank Battalion (1958) - 'Egg Charlie'
 Tokyo After Dark (1959) - Father (uncredited)
 The Night Walker (1964) - Gardener (final film role)

References

External links

1894 births
1970 deaths
People from Kumamoto
Japanese male film actors
20th-century Japanese male actors
American film actors of Asian descent
Japanese emigrants to the United States
People from Gardena, California
Japanese-American internees
Actors from Kumamoto Prefecture
American male actors of Japanese descent